Classic Diamonds is the ninth studio album by the German female hard rock singer Doro Pesch. It was released worldwide in 2004 by AFM Records. The album presents new acoustic and symphonic arrangements for songs from Doro's repertoire, as well as some new compositions. The music is mostly played by the Classic Night Orchestra, an ensemble of young classical musicians that accompanied Doro in the following European tour.

Overview
Doro Pesch had already experienced mixing her powerful hard rock vocals with a symphonic orchestra in 2001 in a concert in Düsseldorf and later in 2003 for a benefit concert in Bochum. Excerpts from both shows are contained in the Für Immer DVD. The results of the two shows and the reaction of the fans prompted the German singer to plan a more organic approach to the symphonic facets of her songs, scheduling an album and a tour with an orchestra. The Classic Night Orchestra was recruited looking for young, open-minded, and multi-ethnic classical musicians, reaching the number of 30 elements. With the help of the classically trained band member Oliver Palotai and producer Torsten Sickert, Doro arranged some old and new tracks for the orchestra and recorded them in Cologne. The album took almost eight months to complete and is the most expensive recording produced by Doro.

Besides the eleven songs played with the orchestra, the album contains two tracks recorded live and acoustically in studio by Doro's band and two other tracks played by Torsten Sickert with an emulator tuned to classical instruments.

The album was published at the same time of the European tour, where many elements of the Classic Night Orchestra played together with Doro's usual live band in most venues. At Wacken Open Air festival on 6 August 2004, the full Classic Night Orchestra was on stage for the show. Various shows of the Classic Diamonds tour were filmed and later released on Classic Diamonds – The DVD.

The album was published in various formats by AFM Records, with and without bonus tracks and even as a deluxe 2-CD set, together with the Let Love Rain on Me EP.

"Breaking the Law" is a cover of the Judas Priest song, recorded on their 1980 album British Steel.

The album peaked at position No. 33 in the German Longplay chart.

Track listing

Limited edition also has "Let Love Rain on Me" music video.

Personnel
 Doro Pesch – vocals

The Classic Night Orchestra
 Arnt Böhme – conductor, orchestral arrangements on tracks 1, 2, 5
 Hye-sin Tjo, Ardan Saguner, Nonna Parfenov, Elda Teqja, Marco Stankovic, Ingrid Illguth – first violins
 Carolin Kosa, Arhan Saguner, Emma Fridman, Jee-eun Lee, Alexander Schneider – second violins
 Wiebke Corssen, Urs Beckers, Ernst Hesse, Kristina Iczque, Manuela Crespi – violas
 Lev Gordin, Martin Henneken, Jens Peter Jandausch, Luise Schroeter – violoncellos
 Milivoj Plavsic – contrabass 
 Daniel Edelhoff, Jörg Brohm – trumpets
 Wolfgang Mundt, Carsten Gronwald – second trumpets
 Andreas Roth, Peter Schatlo – trombones
 Jan Böhme – bass trombone
 Klaus 'Major' Heuser – acoustic guitars
 Wolf Simon – drums
 Mario Arrangonda – percussion

Additional musicians
 Johnny Dee – drums on tracks 10 and 14
 Udo Dirkschneider – lead vocals on track 3
 Nick Douglas – bass on tracks 10 and 14
 Claus Fischer– bass on track 4
 Kai Hansen – guitars and bass on track 13, acoustic guitars, backing vocals
 Oliver Palotai – piano, orchestral arrangements on tracks 6, 7, 12, 15
 Dirk Schoppen – bass on track 4, backing vocals
 Joe Taylor – acoustic guitar on tracks 10 and 14
 Martin Wagemann – solo trumpet
 Oliver Best, Thomas Nathan, Klaus Vanscheidt – backing vocals

Production
 Torsten Sickert – producer, Midnight Orchestra on tracks 9 and 13, orchestral arrangements on tracks 3, 4, 8, 9, 11, 13, 15
 Chris Lietz – producer
 Mika Jussila – mastering
 Wieland Reißmann – engineer, orchestral arrangements on track 9
 Thorsten Rentsch – engineer, mixing

References

External links
American site
 

Doro (musician) albums
2004 albums
AFM Records albums